Cladymore or Clady More is a small village and townland in County Armagh, Northern Ireland. It is within the Armagh City and District Council area. It had a population of 139 people (52 households) in the 2011 Census. (2001 Census: 129 people)

References

External links 
St Michael's Church

Villages in County Armagh
Townlands of County Armagh